Seán O'Kennedy (20 January 1885 – 22 June 1949) was an Irish Gaelic footballer and hurler. His championship career with the Wexford senior teams spanned fourteen years from 1908 until 1922.

Born in New Ross, County Wexford, O'Kennedy was born to James and Mary Kennedy (née Browner). The son of a merchant clerk, he was educated locally and later worked as an accountant.

O'Kennedy first played competitive hurling and Gaelic football with the New Ross Geraldines club. He enjoyed much success at the highest level, winning a county hurling championship medal in 1913 and a county football championship medal in 1915.

By 1908, O'Kennedy was a regular member of the Wexford senior hurling team. He won an All-Ireland medal in 1910, before later becoming a key member of the Wexford senior football team. O'Kennedy won three successive All-Ireland medals as captain of the team between 1914 and 1917. He also won five successive Leinster medals as a Gaelic footballer and one Leinster medal as a hurler. O'Kennedy played his last game for Wexford in 1922.

Honours

New Ross Geraldines
Wexford Senior Football Championship (1): 1915
Wexford Senior Hurling Championship (1): 1913

Wexford
All-Ireland Senior Hurling Championship (1): 1910
All-Ireland Senior Football Championship (3): 1915 (c), 1916 (c), 1917 (c)
Leinster Senior Hurling Championship (1): 1910
Leinster Senior Football Championship (5): 1913, 1914 (c), 1915 (c), 1916 (c), 1917 (c)

References

1949 deaths
1885 births
Dual players
Wexford inter-county hurlers
Wexford inter-county Gaelic footballers
All-Ireland Senior Hurling Championship winners
Geraldine O'Hanrahan's hurlers
Geraldine O'Hanrahan's Gaelic footballers
Irish accountants